Gerry Doyle (16 September 1911 in Dublin – 3 December 1990) was an Irish football player and manager in Ireland who spent most of his football career with Shelbourne in the League of Ireland.

Doyle managed Shels from the end of the 1956/57 season, having taken over from Eddie Gannon, to October 1965. He managed Shels again from the start of the 1967/68 season to September 1975 and was succeeded by Tommy Carroll.

Doyle's first spell as Shels manager was a successful one. He promoted a number of the club's 1959 FAI Youth Cup winning team to the first team and his decision was rewarded the following season as Shels claimed the FAI Cup for the second time. The league title would be won in a play-off against Cork Hibernians in 1962 and the FAI Cup was won again in 1963.

Doyle also took the first ever Shels team into Europe when they played Sporting Clube de Portugal in the European Cup in 1962/63. It was a huge step up for Shels as was the following year's clash in the Cup Winners' Cup against Barcelona, but the experience was to stand Doyle's team in good stead and they knocked Portuguese side Belenenses out of the Fairs Cup in 1964.

He became Dundalk F.C. manager in April 1965. After one season at Oriel Park he moved to St Patrick's Athletic in June 1966.

Came back to Shels in August 1967 and in his second spell as Shels manager, the League of Ireland Shield was won in 1971 which also qualified the club for the UEFA Cup.

Honours

Manager
Shelbourne F.C.
 League of Ireland: 1
 1961-62
 FAI Cup:  2 
 1960, 1963
 League of Ireland Shield: 1
 1971

Trivia
Doyle is the only person to be player, manager, chairman and president of Shelbourne.

References

Republic of Ireland football managers
League of Ireland players
League of Ireland managers
Shelbourne F.C. players
Shelbourne F.C. managers
St Patrick's Athletic F.C. managers
Dundalk F.C. managers
1911 births
1990 deaths
Association footballers not categorized by position
Republic of Ireland association footballers